Kurt Mann (born 1 March 1993) is an Australian professional rugby league footballer who plays for the Newcastle Knights in the NRL.

He previously played for the Melbourne Storm and St. George Illawarra Dragons in the National Rugby League.

Background
Mann was born in Winton, Queensland, Australia and was educated at St. Brendan's College, Yeppoon.

Mann played his junior rugby league for the Winton Diamantina Devils, before being signed by the Newcastle Knights.

Playing career

Early career
In 2011 and 2012, Mann played for the Newcastle Knights' NYC team.

On 21 April 2012, he played for the Queensland under-20s team against the New South Wales under-20s team.

On 20 June 2012, he signed a three-year contract with the Melbourne Storm starting in 2013. He played for the Storm's NYC team in 2013. 

On 20 April 2013, he again played for the Queensland under-20s team against the New South Wales under-20s team.

2014
In 2014, Mann moved on to Melbourne's New South Wales Cup team, the Cronulla-Sutherland Sharks. In February 2014, he played for Melbourne in the inaugural NRL Auckland Nines. In round 9 of the 2014 NRL season, he made his NRL debut for the Melbourne Storm, against Manly-Warringah. He played at centre and scored the match winning try on debut, in Melbourne's 22-19 win at AAMI Park. He finished off his debut year in the NRL having played in 8 matches and scored 6 tries. Furthermore, he was the awarded 2014 Melbourne Storm Rookie of the Year.

2015
On 31 January and 1 February, Mann played in the Melbourne club's 2015 NRL Auckland Nines campaign. On 1 July 2015, he signed a two-year contract with the St. George Illawarra Dragons, starting in 2016. He finished off his last year with the Storm by playing in 20 matches and scoring 4 tries.

2016
In February, Mann played for St. George Illawarra in the 2016 NRL Auckland Nines.

In round 1 of the 2016 NRL season, he made his club debut for St. George Illawarra against his former club, Melbourne, playing at fullback in the Saints 16-18 loss at AAMI Park. In round 12, against the North Queensland Cowboys, he scored his first try for St. George Illawarra. He was the club's leading try-scorer for the season with ten tries. Mann was a member of the Illawarra side which won the 2016 NSW Cup with a 21-20 victory over Mounties in the final.

2017
Mann was named in St. George Illawarra's squad for the 2017 NRL Auckland Nines. He played in 21 games, scoring 7 tries for St. George Illawarra in the 2017 season.

2018
Mann played in 26 games and scored three tries for St. George Illawarra in the 2018 season. In December, he was granted a release from the final year of his St. George contract, to return to the Newcastle Knights on a three-year contract starting in 2019.

2019
Mann played 19 games and scored five tries for Newcastle in the 2019 NRL season as the club finished a disappointing 11th on the table.  At the start of the year, many tipped Newcastle to reach the finals after the club recruited heavily in the off-season.

2020
He made 17 appearances for Newcastle in the 2020 NRL season including the club's first finals game since 2013 which was an elimination finals loss against South Sydney.

2021
Mann played 22 games for Newcastle in the 2021 NRL season including the club's elimination finals loss against Parramatta.

2022
Mann played a total of eleven matches for Newcastle in the 2022 NRL season as the club finished 14th on the table and missed the finals.

References

External links
Newcastle Knights profile
St. George Illawarra Dragons profile
NRL profile

1993 births
Living people
Australian rugby league players
Melbourne Storm players
Illawarra Cutters players
Newcastle Knights players
Rugby league centres
Rugby league fullbacks
Rugby league five-eighths
Rugby league wingers
Rugby league halfbacks
Rugby league hookers
Rugby league locks
Rugby league players from Queensland
St. George Illawarra Dragons players
Sunshine Coast Falcons players